Randlett is a town in Cotton County, Oklahoma, United States. The population was 438 at the 2010 census, a decline of 14.3 percent from 511 in 2000.

History
The town of Randlett was named for James F. Randlett, an agent for the Comanche and Kiowa. It was platted in 1906, and the lots were sold at a public auction on May 13, 1907. By 1910, it had a population of 574. An attempt to attract a railroad failed, but Randlett still prospered as an agricultural center. A brief oil and gas drilling boom occurred in the 1910s and 20s.

Geography
Randlett is located at  (34.176736, -98.465474).

Demographics

As of the census of 2000, there were 511 people, 194 households, and 140 families residing in the town. There were 210 housing units at an average density of 333.1 per square mile (128.7/km2). The racial makeup of the town was 95.89% White, 0.20% African American, 0.98% Native American, 0.20% Pacific Islander, 1.37% from other races, and 1.37% from two or more races. Hispanic or Latino of any race were 4.70% of the population.

There were 194 households, out of which 36.1% had children under the age of 18 living with them, 56.2% were married couples living together, 12.4% had a female householder with no husband present, and 27.8% were non-families. 24.2% of all households were made up of individuals, and 13.9% had someone living alone who was 65 years of age or older. The average household size was 2.63 and the average family size was 3.16.

In the town, the population was spread out, with 28.4% under the age of 18, 7.0% from 18 to 24, 29.9% from 25 to 44, 20.9% from 45 to 64, and 13.7% who were 65 years of age or older. The median age was 34 years. For every 100 females, there were 102.0 males. For every 100 females age 18 and over, there were 97.8 males.

The median income for a household in the town was $27,019, and the median income for a family was $30,455. Males had a median income of $25,000 versus $21,429 for females. The per capita income for the town was $11,455. About 12.7% of families and 15.5% of the population were below the poverty line, including 20.7% of those under age 18 and 23.6% of those age 65 or over.

Randlett is served by Big Pasture Public Schools, a rural consolidated school system.

References

Towns in Cotton County, Oklahoma
Towns in Oklahoma